Armenian Republic may refer to:

First Republic of Armenia (1918-1920), officially known as Republic of Armenia
Republic of Mountainous Armenia (1921)
Armenian Soviet Socialist Republic (Armenian SSR) (1920–1922, 1936–1991), also known as Soviet Armenia or the Second Republic of Armenia
Armenian Republic, present-day Armenia (1991-present)

See also
Republic of Artsakh previously known as Nagorno-Karabakh Republic, a breakaway de facto Armenian state and republic (1994-present)